Casterlorum ("Caster's whip") is a genus of fossil with controversial interpretation from the Middle Ordovician (Darriwilian, 460 million years old) Douglas Lake Member of the Lenoir Limestone from Douglas Dam  Tennessee The genus was named in honor of Ken Caster.

Description
Casterlorum was interpreted a hornwort by Gregory Retallack. Casterlorum has a wide dichotomizing gametophyte thallus with dichotomizing dark lines interpreted as mucilage canals with cyanobacterial symbionts. The sporophyte horns have a thick basal involucre and when dehisced form whip like curls. Spores are small and laevigate.

Interpretation
Hornworts of such antiquity have been considered controversial because heavily ornamented spores like those of Anthoceros have not been found among Ordovician spore assemblages. The spores of Casterlorum are small and smooth, like those of the living hornwort Leiosporoceros, which is considered basal to the family tree of hornworts. The hornwort interpretation of this fossil has been contested by some, but accepted elsewhere

References

Fossils of Tennessee
Fossil record of plants
Ordovician plants
Hornworts
Prehistoric plant genera
Bryophyte genera